Lowz Dar (also known as Līzdar and Līzz̄ar) is a village in Chahar Cheshmeh Rural District, Kamareh District, Khomeyn County, Markazi Province, Iran. At the 2006 census, its population was 10, in 4 families.

References 

Populated places in Khomeyn County